Sergio Dellachá (11 November 1925 – 9 September 2006) was an Argentine equestrian. He competed in two events at the 1952 Summer Olympics.

References

1925 births
2006 deaths
Argentine male equestrians
Olympic equestrians of Argentina
Equestrians at the 1952 Summer Olympics
Sportspeople from Milan